Macrossan may refer to:

People
Hugh Denis Macrossan (1881–1940), Australian politician and judge
John Macrossan (1832–1891), Australian politician
John Murtagh Macrossan (judge) (1930–2008), Australian judge
Neal Macrossan (1889–1955), Australian lawyer and judge

Places
 Macrossan, Queensland, Australia